Hockey Night Live is a current events sports talk show about NHL hockey broadcast on MSG Network. Its main host, Al Trautwig, is joined by a panel that includes Steve Valiquette, Ron Duguay, Dave Maloney, Butch Goring, John MacLean, and E.J. Hradek, with contributions from Stan Fischler and John Giannone.  Bill Pidto serves as panel moderator and host when Trautwig is on assignment or unavailable.

The program primarily provides insight into the four NHL teams that MSG holds broadcast rights: the Buffalo Sabres, New York Islanders, New Jersey Devils, and MSG-owned New York Rangers. Hockey-related topics of broad importance are occasionally discussed.

From its inception until February 2016, the show was broadcast on Saturdays following the local hockey game. On February 4, 2016, the show became part of MSG Network's Thursday Night Hockey program, although the move did not guarantee the same previous local time slot.

External links
 Hockey Night Live! on MSGNetworks.com

American sports television series
National Hockey League on television
MSG Network original programming
2010s American television talk shows